The 1998 PGA of Japan Tour season was played from 12 March to 13 December. The season consisted of 36 official money events in Japan, as well as the four majors.

Schedule
The following table lists official events during the 1998 season.

Unofficial events
The following events were sanctioned by the PGA of Japan Tour, but did not carry official money, nor were wins official.

Money list
The money list was based on prize money won during the season, calculated in Japanese yen.

Notes

References

External links

Japan Golf Tour
PGA of Japan Tour
PGA of Japan Tour